Khasala Khurd is a village of Rawalpindi District in the Punjab province of Pakistan. It is located at 33°26'45N 72°58'23E with an altitude of 370 metres (1217ft) and lies south of the district capital, Rawalpindi.Khurd and Kalan Persian language word which means small and Big respectively when two villages have same name then it is distinguished as Kalan means Big and Khurd means Small with Village Name.

References

Populated places in Rawalpindi District